Geoma Records is an English independent record label which was founded by George David Madgwick in 2013.

History
Geoma Records was founded in Spring 2013 as a label name for a social media based dance release for the song "Feel My Rhythm" by Viralites. The single, released digitally only, peaked in the UK Singles Chart at No. 92. The single only had 24 hours of only social media promotion to generate all the sales secured. Shortly after, they were invited to work with another label where they were responsible for the management of a new boyband known as M.A.D. M.A.D managed to secure a No. 37 chart position with their debut release "Toyboy" after just 10 weeks together as band. Further on, the label released a follow up single called "Fame & TV" which peaked at No. 32 in the UK chart, and hit No. 26 in the Scottish Singles Chart.

In spring 2014, Geoma, agreed on a deal with Kobalt Label Services to fulfil their worldwide digital distribution and partner with their current physical distributor Cargo Records. After 2015, off from releasing records Geoma signed a new distribution deal with Republic of Music / Universal for worldwide distribution. In 2016, they planned releases with artists such as Mikey Bromley, Dylan Evans and Joey Devries. Geoma has also extended their arm to producing compilation albums.

Artists
 Mikey Bromley
 Dylan Evans
 Joey Devries
 The Bachelors - 1950s/1960s group
 M.A.D
 Nathan Grisdale - One song distribution only
 Viralites

Notable recordings

Albums
 M.A.D - M.A.D (Geoma Records, 2014) UK No. 36
 Mikey Bromley - This One's For You (Geoma Records, 2016) UK No. 43

Singles
Top 100 Singles
 Viralites - "Feel My Rhythm" (Geoma Records, 2013) UK No. 92
 M.A.D ft. Kobe Onyame - "Toyboy" (Geoma Records, 2013) UK No. 37
 M.A.D - "Fame & TV" (Geoma Records, 2014) UK No. 32
 M.A.D - "Shotgun" (Geoma Records, 2014) UK No. 30
 Nathan Grisdale - "Only One" (Boxx Records / Geoma Records, 2015) UK No. 67
 Only The Young - "I Do" (The QWorkz / Geoma Records, 2015) UK No. 53
 Only The Young - "I Do" (Geoma Records, 2015) Ireland No. 41
 Mr Meanor - "Here With You" (Geoma Records, 2015) UK No. 41

See also
List of record labels: A–H

References

External links
 

British independent record labels
English record labels
Music retailers of the United Kingdom
Record labels established in 2013